Rubén (Mora) Amaro Sr. (January 6, 1936 – March 31, 2017) was a Mexican professional baseball player. He played as a shortstop and first baseman in Major League Baseball from 1958 through 1969.

Career

He finished 21st in voting for the 1964 National League Most Valuable Player for playing in 129 games and having 299 at-bats, 31 runs, 79 hits, 11 doubles, 4 home runs, 34 runs batted in, 16 walks, a .264 batting average, a .307 on-base percentage, and a .341 slugging percentage.

Shortly after joining the New York Yankees, Amaro suffered a knee ligament injury in a collision with left fielder Tom Tresh. The injury limited Amaro to just 14 games in 1966.

Personal life
Amaro's father, Santos, was Cuban and played as an outfielder in the Mexican League. His mother Josefina Mora was from Mexico.

His Rubén Jr., was an outfielder in Major League Baseball in the 1990s and served as the General Manager of the Philadelphia Phillies from 2009–2015. Amaro's son, Luis, also played briefly for the Philadelphia Phillies in minor league baseball, and is currently the General Manager of the Aguilas del Zulia baseball team in the Venezuelan Professional Baseball League. He also has a son David Amaro and a daughter Alayna Amaro.

Amaro served as a member of the board of the Baseball Assistance Team, a 501(c)(3) non-profit organization dedicated to helping former Major League, Minor League, and Negro league players through financial and medical hardships. 

Amaro died on March 31, 2017 of natural causes.

In popular culture

His son, Rubén Amaro Jr., portrayed him on two episodes (S5E11 and S6E6) of The Goldbergs, an ABC series which is set in the 1980s. His son attended William Penn Charter School, the same school as TV and film producer Adam F. Goldberg, on whose adolescence the show is based.

See also

 List of members of the Mexican Professional Baseball Hall of Fame
 List of second-generation Major League Baseball players

References

External links

Rubén Amaro Sr at SABR (Baseball BioProject)
Rubén Amaro Sr at Baseball Almanac

1936 births
2017 deaths
Águilas de Mexicali players
Baseball players from Veracruz
Buffalo Bisons (minor league) players
California Angels players
Caribbean Series managers
Chicago Cubs coaches
Deaths from cancer in Florida
Detroit Tigers scouts
Eugene Emeralds players
Gold Glove Award winners
Houston Astros scouts
Houston Buffaloes players
Indianapolis Indians players
Major League Baseball players from Mexico
Major League Baseball third base coaches
Major League Baseball shortstops
Mexican Baseball Hall of Fame inductees
Mexican expatriate baseball players in the United States
Mexican people of Cuban descent
Mexican League baseball managers
Minor league baseball managers
Naranjeros de Hermosillo players
New York Yankees players
Philadelphia Phillies coaches
Philadelphia Phillies players
Philadelphia Phillies scouts
Reading Phillies players
Rojos del Águila de Veracruz players
Rochester Red Wings players
St. Louis Cardinals players
Tomateros de Culiacán players
Yaquis de Obregón players